Toivo Sariola (26 June 1914 – 3 April 1985) was a Finnish sprinter. He competed in the men's 100 metres at the 1936 Summer Olympics.

References

1914 births
1985 deaths
Athletes (track and field) at the 1936 Summer Olympics
Finnish male sprinters
Olympic athletes of Finland
Place of birth missing